Gervais Waye-Hive (born 11 June 1988) is a Seychellois professional footballer who plays as a forward for St Louis FC.

Career statistics

International
Scores and results list Seychelles' goal tally first.

Honours 
St Michel United
 Seychelles First Division: 2011, 2014

References

External links 
 

1988 births
Living people
Seychellois footballers
Seychelles international footballers
St Michel United FC players
Association football forwards